The Sawatch Formation is a geologic formation in eastern Colorado. It is a sedimentary sequence formed approximately 530 million years ago during a marine transgression. It preserves fossils dating back to the Cambrian period. It is composed of glauconitic and quartz-rich sandstone.

See also

 List of fossiliferous stratigraphic units in Colorado
 Paleontology in Colorado

References

 

https://pubs.usgs.gov/of/1992/0718/report.pdf

Cambrian Colorado
Cambrian southern paleotropical deposits